As a paraphilia, breast fetishism (also known as mastofact, breast partialism, or mazophilia) is a highly atypical sexual interest consisting of an exclusive focus on female breasts, which is a type of partialism. The term breast fetishism is also used in the non-paraphilic sense, to refer to cultural attention to female breasts and the sexuality they represent.

Scientists hypothesize that non-paraphilic sexual attraction to breasts is the result of their function as a secondary sex characteristic. The breasts play roles in both sexual pleasure and reproduction.

Some authors have discussed the modern widespread fascination with breasts among heterosexual males in Western societies, especially in the United States, within the context of sexual fetishism.

Scientific explanation
Scientists hypothesize that non-paraphilic sexual attraction to breasts is the result of their function as a secondary sex characteristic. The breasts play roles in both sexual pleasure and reproduction. Men typically find female breasts attractive and this holds true for a variety of cultures.

Zoologist and ethologist Desmond Morris theorizes that cleavage is a sexual signal that imitates the image of the cleft between the buttocks, which according to Morris in The Naked Ape is also unique to humans, other primates as a rule having much flatter buttocks. Evolutionary psychologists theorize that humans' permanently enlarged breasts, in contrast to other primates' breasts, which only enlarge during ovulation, allows human females to "solicit [human] male attention and investment even when they are not really fertile".

Sexual attraction to breasts is considered normal unless it is exclusive and is therefore a form of partialism.

Society and culture

General

There is a widespread fascination with women's breasts, and especially their size. Many people, both male and female, consider breasts an important female secondary sex characteristic.

Modern female fashions which focus on tight clothing and the display of cleavage have been attributed to an increase in breast fetishism. Display of cleavage with a low neckline is often regarded as a form of feminine flirting or seduction, as well as aesthetic or erotic. Most heterosexual men derive erotic pleasure from seeing a woman's breasts, and some people derive pleasure in their female partner exposing cleavage. When cleavage is enhanced with a push-up bra or exposed by a low neckline it may draw attention. There are differences of opinion as to how much cleavage exposure is acceptable in public. The extent to which a woman may expose her breasts depends on social and cultural context. Displaying cleavage or any part of female breast may be considered inappropriate or even prohibited by dress codes in some settings, such as workplaces, churches, and schools, while in some spaces showing as much cleavage as possible can be permissible or even encouraged. The exposure of nipples or areolae is almost always considered toplessness, considered by some to be immodest and in some instances as lewd or indecent behavior. Art historian James Laver argued that the changing standards of revealing cleavage is more prominent in evening wear than in day wear in the Western world.

Film producers such as Russ Meyer produced films which featured actresses with large breasts. Lorna (1964) was the first of his films where the lead actress, Lorna Maitland, was selected on the basis of breast size. Other large-breasted actresses used by Meyer include Kitten Natividad, Erica Gavin, Tura Satana, and Uschi Digard. Most were naturally large-breasted; Meyer occasionally cast women in their first trimesters of pregnancy to enhance their breast size even further. Author and director William Rotsler said, "With Lorna Meyer established the formula that made him rich and famous, the formula of people filmed at top hate, top lust, top heavy."

With regard to pornography, according to statistics from the websites Pornhub and YouPorn, preference for either breasts or the buttocks varies between countries and, on average, between world regions; the United States and most of Latin America and Africa is in the buttocks group, and most of Europe and much of Asia is in the breasts group.

Alternative opinions
The term breast fetishism is also used within ethnographic and feminist contexts to describe a society with a culture devoted to breasts, usually as sexual objects. Some feminists have argued that incidents of breast fetishism have been found going back to the neolithic era, with the goddess shrines of Çatalhöyük (in modern Turkey). The archaeological excavations of the town in  revealed the walls of the shrine(s) adorned with disembodied pairs of breasts that appeared to have "an existence of their own". Elizabeth Gould Davis argues that breasts (along with phalluses) were revered by the women of Çatalhöyük as instruments of motherhood, but it was after what she describes as a patriarchal revolution – when men had appropriated both phallus worship and "the breast fetish" for themselves – that these organs "acquired the erotic significance with which they are now endowed".

Some authors from the United States have discussed attraction to female breasts within the context of sexual fetishism, and have stated that it is the American fetish-object of choice, or that breast fetishism is predominantly found in the United States.

See also

Bakunyū
Breast augmentation
Breast bondage
Breast torture
Erotic lactation
Mammary intercourse

References

Further reading
 
 
 
 Draitser, Emil. (1999). Making war, not love: gender and sexuality in Russian humour. The Breast Fetish (pg. 29). Palgrave Macmillan. .
 
 
 Moreck, Curt. (1965). Breast fetishism. International Press of Sexology. ASIN B0007HAEES
 Morrison, D. E., and C. P. Holden. (1971). The Burning Bra: The American Breast Fetish and Women's Liberation. In Deviance and Change, ed. P.K. Manning. Englewood Cliffs, N. J.: Prentice Hall.
 Slade, Joseph W. (2000). Pornography and Sexual Representation: A Reference Guide. Greenwood Publishing Group. 
 Yalom, Marilyn. 1997. A History of the Breast. pub. Knopf. .

Breast
Paraphilias
Sexual fetishism